Jackson Chanet (born February 7, 1978) is a French boxer best known for winning the 2000 European Amateur Boxing Championships heavyweight title.

Amateur career
Chanet was French heavyweight (201 lb limit) champ from 1998- 2000.
At the Euros he defeated Sebastian Köber (Germany), Magomed Aripgadjiev (Azerbaijan) and Emil Garai (Hungary) before earning a DQ victory over Russian southpaw Sultan Ibragimov DSQ-4 to win the European heavyweight crown. At the Olympics he lost the rematch against Ibragimov.

Professional career
At the pros he fought largely at super middleweight (168 lb), 31 lb less than as an amateur.
He also won a European title against Vitali Tsypko in 2005 but was KOd by Armenian Mger Mkrtchyan in his first defense.
In 2006 he lost to David Gogiya.

External links
 

1978 births
Living people
People from Saint-Dizier
Heavyweight boxers
Boxers at the 2000 Summer Olympics
Olympic boxers of France
French male boxers
Sportspeople from Haute-Marne
European Boxing Union champions